The Squirrel Grippers were an Australian duo made up of Tim Smith and Steve Bedwell. They released one album, which was a compilation of the Triple M morning show and some live material.

Discography

Albums

Awards and nominations

ARIA Music Awards
The ARIA Music Awards are a set of annual ceremonies presented by Australian Recording Industry Association (ARIA), which recognise excellence, innovation, and achievement across all genres of the music of Australia. They commenced in 1987.

! 
|-
| 1998 || Nine Inch Males || ARIA Award for Best Comedy Release ||  || 
|-

References

Australian comedy duos